Keith Kelley is an American immunophysiologist, researcher and academic. He is Professor Emeritus of Immunophysiology at the University of Illinois and Editor-In-Chief Emeritus of Brain, Behavior, and Immunity. He is a Past-President and Secretary-Treasurer of the Psychoneuroimmunology Research Society.

Kelley's work has been focused on discovering interactions between the nervous system and the immune system, and the relationship between behavior and health. He is considered as an international authority on reciprocal communication systems between the immune system and brain. His career research contributions have greatly impacted the major fields in psychoneuroimmunology, including some of the first studies on the effects of stress on immunity that continue today with his Chinese colleagues, the restoration of immune functions in aged subjects by pituitary-derived hormones, the role of hormones on susceptibility to infectious disease and haematopoiesis, the molecular mechanisms that mediate the inhibitory effects of the proinflammatory cytokine TNFα on muscle, cancer and neuronal cells, and the underpinnings of sickness and depressive-like behaviors. He has published over 250 scientific articles and more than 70 book chapters. He is well cited with a Hirsch index of 75, been funded for 50 years as the Principal Investigator of NIH grants, and has served on six dozen NIH study sections. Kelley has been invited to present over 350 lectures world-wide in countries and regions that include China, Western Europe, Hungary, Vietnam, Russia, Africa, Taiwan, and Australia.

In 2011, Kelley was elected as a Fellow of the American Association for the Advancement of Science in Medical Sciences for “…exceptional and scholarly contributions in brain, behavior, and immunity by recognizing and advancing the physiology of immunology and its role in communicating with the brain.”

Early life and education 
Kelley was born in Bloomington, Illinois on 5 November 1947. After completing his B.S. from Illinois State University in 1969, he was drafted into the US Army, serving 14 months in Fire Direction Control of the field artillery during the Vietnam War. Upon completing military service in 1971, he enrolled in graduate school at the University of Illinois at Urbana-Champaign (UIUC), completing his M.S. degree in 1973. He continued working as a graduate research assistant, receiving a Ph.D. from UIUC in 1976 with his thesis in the area of energy metabolism.

Career 
Immediately after completing his Ph.D., Kelley joined Washington State University as an assistant professor and conducted research there until 1984. In 1982, he was invited by the Institut National de la Recherche Agronomique (INRA) for a one-year research project, which he completed in Paris, France during a sabbatical from Washington State University. In 1983, he was awarded a fellowship from the French medical research branch, Institut National de la Santé et de la Recherche Médicale (INSERM), to conduct investigations on catecholamines and immune function.

In 1984, on returning to the United States, Kelley left Washington State University to return to the UIUC as a professor in the Department of Animal Sciences. He was awarded a fellowship by the French government branch, Ecole Practique des Hautes Etudes and INRA in 1987 to conduct investigations on neuroendocrine and immune functions during aging. From 1987 to 1988, Kelley served as the first Program Manager for the USDA Competitive Biotechnology Program in Animal Growth and Development.

Kelley joined the Department of Pathology in the College of Medicine at the University of Illinois-Chicago (UIC) in 2006. There he worked to expand the collaborative efforts of the Integrative Immunology and Behavior (IIB) Program in the College of Agricultural, Consumer and Environmental Sciences and College of Medicine.

One of Kelley's major scientific efforts was in service of the journal, Brain, Behavior, and Immunity. From 1990 to 2002, Kelley served on the editorial board. He was then asked to serve as only the second editor-in-chief of Brain, Behavior, and Immunity. He served in this capacity from 2003 to 2017, during which time the significance of the journal rose rapidly, as assessed by 3-fold rise in the impact factor of the journal. Under Kelley's editorship, the journal was ranked by the ISI Web of Science in the top 15% of all scientific journals in the categories of both neuroscience and immunology, and more recently in psychiatry

Kelley was an Associate Editor for Animal Biotechnology from 1989 to 1994. He has served on the editorial boards of Neuroendocrinology (1995–1999), Endocrinology (1994–1998), Neuroimmunomodulation (1993–2018), Progress in NeuroEndocrinImmunology (1988–1993), and Current Pharmaceutical Design (2003–2019). He has also been on the editorial boards of the International Journal of Medical Sciences and the International Journal of Tryptophan Research.

Kelley has been involved with corporations and organizations as a consultant. He has been a consultant to International Minerals and Chemical Corporation (1986–1987), Farmland Industries (1989), Marion Merrell Dow (1990–1993) and the Electric Power Research Institute (1994–1998). He served as a consultant with Pfizer Global Research in 2001 and for AstraZeneca Pharmaceuticals in 2009.

Psychoneuroimmunology Research Society 
Throughout his career, Kelley has been involved in many capacities with the non-profit research organization, the Psychoneuroimmunology Research Society, which officially was established in 1993. He was elected as a scientific councillor for a two-year term starting in 1992, and then served as the second secretary-treasurer of the new society from 1994 to 1998. He was elected as the president of the society in 1999 and later served on the Web Transition Committee, Finance Committee and Communication Committee and ad hoc as the editor-in-chief of Brain, Behavior, and Immunity.

In 2012, Kelley initiated the first effort of the PNIRS to engage with Chinese scientists conducting research in both traditional and Western medicine. He organized the PNIRS-China Committee and served as the Chair of that committee. The Chinese Government awarded him a grant that helped establish an active regional network of Chinese scientists/physicians conducting research in brain, behavior and immunity. In 2016, the PNIRS-China committee was installed as a standing committee, expanded and renamed as the PNIRS-Asia-Pacific committee. This committee has been quite successful in extending the global outreach of scientific symposia that was initiated by PNIRS-China to many Eastern countries in addition to China, including Japan, South Korea, Australia, New Zealand and India.

Research  
Kelley's research has been focused on discovering interactions between the nervous and immune systems and their relationship between behavior and health. He was among the first scientists to combine immunology and neuroscience in integrative physiology. In 1976, when he completed his Ph.D., the immune system was considered only to protect against infectious diseases. He reshaped that view by applying immunological and neuroscience concepts to biomedical research. Owing to his research and contributions, it is now accepted by the scientific community at-large that there is an active dialogue between the immune system and brain. In his research, he used two approaches to prove the existence of important neuroendocrine-immune communication systems: substances from the brain and neuroendocrine system affect immune responses, and that products from an activated immune system affect the brain. These messengers are hormones and cytokines, respectively.

TNF Inhibition of Cell Function 
In early 2000s, Kelley was asked to share his new concept of how TNF affects neurons and other cells for Trends in Neuroscience. In this article, Kelley explained how his group discovered that the pro-inflammatory cytokine TNF acts in a way that had never before been expected. Up until this time, the p55 receptor for TNF was best characterized by its ability to induce signals that directly trigger cell death. However, Kelley discovered that this is not the only way the TNF receptor inhibits a variety of cell functions. He developed strong evidence for a new concept by which the TNF receptor acts indirectly through the Silencing Of Survival Signals (SOSS). In this view, the TNF receptor acts to inhibit survival signals, such as phosphatidylinositol 3’-kinase (PI 3-kinase), that are activated by the insulin-like growth factor-I receptor. His group also showed that very low concentrations of TNF act similarly on breast cancer cells to inhibit their growth without killing the cells. His group went on to establish that IL-1 as well as TNF impairs the ability of the growth-promoting peptide, insulin-like growth factor-I (IGF-I), to increase protein synthesis in progenitor muscle cells known as myoblasts. Subsequent work in his laboratory supported this concept and enabled further characterization of the molecular mechanisms that are responsible for the paralyzing effects of TNF.

This mechanism of intracellular cross-talk is likely to be the most pathophysiologically relevant action of TNF in vivo and is applicable to a broad number of receptors that are localized on the same cell. Kelley later presented evidence for the basic mechanism of TNF-induced resistance of the IGF receptor, which also explains why TNF inhibits the ability of myoblasts to grow and synthesize protein.

Role of IGF-I in survival and differentiation of cells of the immune system 
In 1996, Kelley and his students showed that IGF-I is a survival factor for both hematopoietic cells and cerebellar granule neurons. Prior to their research, IGF-I was only known as a peptide that promotes the growth and development of muscle tissue in humans. Their discovery helped in the understanding how white blood cells live, die and develop into mature cells that actively defend the body against infectious diseases.

Kelley and his team discovered that IGF-I acts by maintaining cellular expression of a survival protein known as Bcl-2, and this is accomplished by activating the key intracellular enzyme PI 3-kinase. Differentiation of promyeloid cells into both neutrophils and macrophages is also promoted by IGF-I. Differentiation  of promyeloid cells in the presence of IGF-I  causes phosphorylation of a key intracellular signaling molecule utilized by the IGF-I receptor, insulin receptor substrate-2 (formerly known as IL-4 phosphorylated substrate; 4PS), which allows for activation of further downstream pathways. Enhanced differentiation is associated with elevated expression of cyclin E, inactivation of the retinoblastoma tumor suppression and suppression of the p27KIP1 inhibitor.

Aging and decline of immune system function 
In 1986, Kelley developed a model to study the regulation of immune function based on the fact that the ability of animals and humans to withstand infections declines as they age. He reasoned that the decline in immune function might be directly correlated with the decline in the production and release of pituitary-derived growth hormone. His findings, published that year in the Proceedings of the National Academy of Sciences, demonstrated for the first time that the shrunken and atrophic key lymphoid organ, the thymus, could be rejuvenated by growth hormone. He subsequently showed that growth hormone overcomes a block in the development of T cells in the thymus gland of aged rats, allowing double negative immature thymocytes to complete growth and maturation.

His early work with athymic nude mice in 1987 was used by the NIH to study T cell differentiation in mice with congenital defects in both T and B cell development. In the early 2000s, his research in this area showed that growth hormone reverses the loss of erythrocytic and myelocytic cells in the bone marrow of aged rats. This recovery is accompanied by a complete reversal of the accumulation of adipocytes in the bone marrow. Growth hormone has now been shown to be beneficial in aged humans.

NIH funded Kelley's research on aging, growth hormone and immunity, and the USDA funded Kelley's work for 9 consecutive years. In 1992, Kelley was asked to serve as a Special Editor for an entire, peer-reviewed issue of Brain, Behavior, and Immunity (Vol. 6) that was dedicated to the topic of growth hormone, prolactin, IGF-I, and immunity.

Genes involved in neuroendocrine regulation of resistance to infectious disease 
In 1991, Kelley and his colleagues published a paper in Proceedings of the National Academy of Sciences that demonstrated a critical role for the neuroendocrine system in protective immunity. His group demonstrated that in the absence of a pituitary gland, rats infected with Salmonella typhimurium die much more rapidly than their sham-operated controls with a hypophysis. Further research by Kelley showed that growth hormone significantly improves survival of rats infected with S. typhimurium by increasing the bactericidal activity of macrophages and neutrophils. In the late 1980s, Kelley's group showed that this occurs because growth hormone activates macrophages and neutrophils to produce superoxide anion. By using a panel of growth hormone variants created by site-directed mutagenesis, Kelley and his colleagues at Genentech showed that human neutrophils use the prolactin rather than the growth hormone receptor to prime phagocytes for free oxygen radical secretion.

Molecular basis for neural-immune system interactions
Kelley was the first to use a molecular approach to show that a classical pituitary hormone, pro-opiomelanocortin, is actually synthesized by leukocytes. In the early 1990s, he expanded these findings with colleagues at Ohio State University to show that leukocytes also synthesize prolactin and IGF-I.

Kelley's data helped form the basis for the idea that leukocytes may serve as a sixth sense for humans because they possess the receptors that are needed to recognize pathogens. In 1992, together with his French colleagues, he offered substantial support for this idea by showing that a cytokine produced after a peripheral infection, IL-1, induces a substantial reduction in the motivation of rats to eat. This reduction was inhibited by administration of an antagonist of the IL-1 receptor directly into the lateral ventricle of the brain. This was the first demonstration that cytokines from the periphery induce sickness behavior by acting in the brain. Kelley used these data to strongly advance the concept of communication networks between the brain and the immune system. This paper, which was the first to provide unequivocal data that advanced the concept of sickness behavior, is now considered a classic, paradigm-shifting contribution by many experts in the field of psychoneuroimmunology. By helping the Bordeaux group to implement molecular biology techniques for the study of expression of cytokines and their receptors in the brain, he was instrumental for providing the formal proof that specific receptors for both forms of the IL-1 receptor are expressed in the pituitary and in the brain. These experiments paved the way for double-labeling, immunohistochemistry experiments showing that both isoforms of the IL-1 receptor are expressed only on pituitary cells that synthesize growth hormone as well as in the brain. One of these photomicrographs was selected for the September, 1996 cover page of Endocrinology.

Kelley's subsequent research in this area addressed the role of IL-10 in life and death signals of microglia.

Connection between disease, sickness and depression 
In the 2000s, Kelley and his research team studied how sickness behavior can develop into depressive-like behavior. He and his team utilized an infectious disease model using Bacillus Calmette–Guérin (BCG), a mycobacteria that is a potent inducer of interferon (IFN)-gamma. Using this model, they found both BCG and IFN-gamma activate an enzyme in the brain, known as indole 2,3-dioxygenase, that catabolizes tryptophan along the kynurenine pathway rather than serotonin.

They found that in response to a peripheral infection, innate immune cells produce pro-inflammatory cytokines that act on the brain to cause sickness behavior. When activation of the peripheral immune system continues unabated, such as during systemic infections, cancer or autoimmune diseases, the ensuing immune signaling to the brain can lead to an exacerbation of sickness and the development of symptoms of depression in vulnerable individuals.

Awards and honors 
1987 - National Animal Management Award, American Society of Animal Science
1992 - Paul A. Funk College Wide Recognition Award for meritorious and outstanding research
1994 - Senior University Scholar for Faculty Excellence, University of Illinois at Urbana-Champaign
1994 - Wellcome Visiting Professorship in Basic Medical Sciences, Kansas State University
1997 - Departmental Recognition for the H.H. Mitchell Award for Excellence in Graduate Teaching and Research, Department of Animal Sciences, University of Illinois at Urbana-Champaign
1997 -  College Wide Recognition for the Senior College Faculty Award for Excellence in Research, College of Agricultural, Consumer and Environmental Sciences, University of Illinois at Urbana-Champaign
1997 - National Animal Physiology and Endocrinology Award, American Society of Animal Science
2003 - Norman Cousins Memorial Lecture and Award from the PsychoNeuroImmunology Research Society
2005 - The Jim Flood Memorial Lecture Distinguished Lectureship: Mind-Body Connection to the Immune System. The 16th Annual Saint Louis University Summer Geriatric Institute, St. Louis, Missouri
2011 - Fellow, American Association for the Advancement of Science (AAAS)

Selected publications

Selected articles 
Kelley, K.W., S. Brief, H.J. Westly, J. Novakofski, P.J. Bechtel, J. Simon and E.B. Walker. 1986. GH3 pituitary adenoma implants can reverse thymic aging. Proc. Natl. Acad. Sci. USA 83:5663 5667.
Westly, H.J., A.J. Kleiss, K.W. Kelley, P.K.Y. Wong and P. H. Yuen. 1986. Newcastle disease virus infected splenocytes express the pro-opiomelanocortin gene. J. Exp. Med. 163:1589 1594.
Edwards, C.K., III., S.M. Ghiasuddin, J.M. Schepper, L.M. Yunger and K.W. Kelley. 1988. A newly defined property of somatotropin: Priming of macrophages for production of superoxide anion. Science 239:769 771.
Edwards, C.K., III., L.M. Yunger, R.M. Lorence, R. Dantzer and K.W. Kelley. 1991. The pituitary gland is required for protection against lethal effects of Salmonella typhimurium. Proc. Natl. Acad. Sci. USA 88:2274 2277.
Kent, S., R.M. Bluthé, K.W. Kelley and R. Dantzer. 1992. Sickness behavior as a new target for drug development. Trends in Pharmacological Sciences 13:24 28.
Fu, Y.K., S. Arkins, G. Fuh, B.C. Cunningham, J.A. Wells, S. Fong, M.J. Cronin, R. Dantzer and K.W. Kelley. 1992. Growth hormone augments superoxide anion secretion of human neutrophils by binding to the prolactin receptor. Journal of Clinical Investigation 89:451 457.
Kent, S., R.M. Bluthé, R. Dantzer, A.J. Hardwick, K.W. Kelley, N.J. Rothwell and J.L. Vannice. 1992. Different receptor mechanisms mediate the pyrogenic and behavioral effects of interleukin 1. Proc. Natl. Acad. Sci. USA 89:9117-9120.
Sabharwal, P., R. Glaser, W. Lafuse, S. Varma, Q. Liu, S. Arkins, R. Kooijman, L. Kutz, K.W. Kelley and W.B. Malarkey. 1992. Prolactin synthesized and secreted by human peripheral blood mononuclear cells: An autocrine growth factor for lymphoproliferation. Proc. Natl. Acad. Sci. USA 89:7713 7716.
Arkins, S., N. Rebeiz, D.L. Brunke-Reese, A. Biragyn and K.W. Kelley. 1995. Interferon-ϒ inhibits macrophage insulin-like growth factor-I synthesis at the transcriptional level. Molecular Endocrinology 9:350-360.
Minshall, C., S. Arkins, R. Dantzer, G.G. Freund and K.W. Kelley. 1999. Phosphatidylinositol 3' kinase, but not S6-kinase, is required for insulin-like growth factor-I and IL-4 to maintain expression of Bcl-2 and promote survival of myeloid progenitors. J. Immunology 162:4542-4549.
Liu, Q., R.W. VanHoy, J.H. Zhou, R. Dantzer, G.G. Freund and K.W. Kelley. 1999. Elevated cyclin E levels, inactive retinoblastoma protein and suppression of the p27KIP1 inhibitor characterize early development of promyeloid cells into macrophages. Molecular and Cellular Biology 19:6229-6239
Zhou, J.H., S.R. Broussard, K. Strle, G.G. Freund, R.W. Johnson, R. Dantzer and K.W. Kelley. 2001. IL-10 inhibits apoptosis of promyeloid cells by activating insulin-receptor substrate-2 and phosphatidylinositol 3’-kinase. J. Immunology 167:4436-4442.
Shen, W.H., Y. Yin, S.R. Broussard, R.H. McCusker, G.G. Freund, R. Dantzer and K.W. Kelley. 2004. Tumor necrosis factor α inhibits cyclin A expression and retinoblastoma hyperphosphorylation triggered by insulin-like growth factor-I induction of new E2F-1 synthesis. J. Biological Chemistry 279:7438-7446.
Dantzer, R., J.C. O’Connor, G.G. Freund, R.W. Johnson and K.W. Kelley. 2008. From inflammation to sickness and depression: When the immune system subjugates the brain. Nature Reviews Neuroscience 9:46-57.
Jang, S., K.W. Kelley and R.W. Johnson. 2008. Luteolin reduces interleukin-6 production in microglia by inhibiting c-Jun N-terminal kinase phosphorylation and activation of AP-1. . Proc. Natl. Acad. Sci. USA 105:7534-7539.

Selected book chapters 
Kelley, K.W. 1985. Immunological consequences of changing environmental stimuli. In G.P. Moberg (Ed.) Animal Stress. American Physiological Society. Bethesda, MD. pp. 193 233.
Edwards, C.K., III., J.M. Schepper, L.M. Yunger and K.W. Kelley. 1988. Somatotropin and prolactin enhance respiratory burst activity of macrophages. In C.S. Raine (Ed.) Second International Congress of Neuroimmunology. New York Academy of Sciences. New York, NY. 540:698 699.
Arkins, S., R.W. Johnson, C. Minshall, R. Dantzer and K.W. Kelley. 2001. Immunophysiology: The interaction of hormones, lymphohemopoietic cytokines and the neuroimmune axis. In B.S. McEwen (Ed.) Coping with the Environment: Neural and Endocrine Mechanisms, Handbook of Physiology, Section 7, The Endocrine System, Vol. 4. American Physiological Society. Oxford University Press. New York, NY. pp. 469–495.
Dantzer, R., R.M Bluthé, N. Castanon, N. Chauvet, L. Capuron, G. Goodall, K.W. Kelley, J.P. Konsman, S. Layé, P. Parnet and F. Pousset. 2001. Cytokine effects on behavior. In R. Ader, D.L. Felten and N. Cohen (Eds.) Psychoneuroimmunology. Third Edition. Academic Press, New York, NY. pp. 703–727.
McCusker, R.H., K. Strle, S.R. Broussard, R. Dantzer, R.M. Bluthé and K.W. Kelley. 2006. Crosstalk between insulin-like growth factors and proinflammatory cytokines. In R. Ader, R. Dantzer, R. Glaser, C. Heijnen, M. Irwin, D. Padgett and J.Sheridan (eds.) Psychoneuroimmunology. Fourth Edition. Elsevier, San Diego. pp. 171–192.
Chang, Q., J.C. O’Connor, S. Szegedi, R. Dantzer and K.W. Kelley. 2008. Cytokine-induced sickness behavior and depression. In A. Siegel and S.S. Zalcman (eds.) The Neurobiological Basis of Behavior and Mental Disorders. Springer. New York, New York. pp. 145–181
Kelley, K.W., A. Aubert and R. Dantzer. 2012. Inflammation and behavior. In G.E. Demas and R.J. Nelson (eds.) Ecoimmunology. Oxford University Press. Oxford Press, New York, NY. pages 383–412.
Kelley, K.W. 2012. Physiology of innate immunity. In Gordon, S. (ed.) Cells of the Innate Immune System: Roles in health and disease. The Biomedical & Life Sciences Collection. Henry Stewart Talks Ltd, London
Walker, A., R. Dantzer and K.W. Kelley. 2013. Mood disorders and immunity. In Changhai Cui, Lindsey Grandison and Antonio Noronha (eds.) Neural-Immune Interactions in Brain Function and Alcohol Related Disorders. Springer Science, New York, NY. pages 167–209. doi 10.1007/978-1-4614-4729-0_6.

References 

American immunologists
1947 births
Living people
Writers from Bloomington, Illinois
Military personnel from Illinois
Illinois State University alumni
University of Illinois Urbana-Champaign alumni
Scientists from Illinois